WCMQ-FM (92.3 FM) is a radio station broadcasting a salsa music and Spanish & English AC format. Licensed to Hialeah, Florida, United States, the station serves the Miami-Ft. Lauderdale area. WCMQ's studios are located at the Raul Alarcon Broadcast Center on Northwest 77th Avenue in Medley, while their transmitter is located atop One Biscayne Tower in Downtown Miami. The station is owned by the Spanish Broadcasting System.

Most of the songs played on the station are in Spanish, although the station plays one or two English-language hits per hour, with the focus being on music from the 1970s through 1990s.

On April 1, 2012, WCMQ-FM changed their format from Spanish classic hits to salsa, branded as "Zeta 92".

On October 31, 2019, the radio decided to include select of English-language hits.

References

External links

CMQ-FM
Hialeah, Florida
Spanish Broadcasting System radio stations
1969 establishments in Florida
Radio stations established in 1969